The Dark Light is a 1951 British thriller film directed by Vernon Sewell and starring Albert Lieven, David Greene, Norman Macowan. It was filmed at a rented country estate in Gilston and on location around Portsmouth.

Synopsis
The crew of a lighthouse take in what they assume to be the survivors of a shipwreck, but who turn out to be criminals on the run after a bank robbery.

Cast
 Albert Lieven as Mark  
 David Greene as Johnny  
 Norman Macowan as Rigby  
 Martin Benson as Luigi  
 Jack Stewart as Matt  
 Katharine Blake as Linda  
 Joan Carol as Joan  
 John Harvey as Roger  
 John Longden as Stephen

Critical reception
The Radio Times called it "dismal" writing that:

References

Bibliography
 Chibnall, Steve & McFarlane, Brian. The British 'B' Film. Palgrave MacMillan, 2009.

External links

1951 films
British thriller films
1950s thriller films
Films directed by Vernon Sewell
Films set in England
Hammer Film Productions films
British black-and-white films
1950s English-language films
1950s British films